Saam,  Saama Kha, is a nearly extinct Kiranti language spoken in Nepal. The name Saam is ambiguous, and shared with neighboring languages.

Chukwa may be Saam if it is not Kulung.

Geographical distribution
Saam is spoken in the following locations of Nepal (Ethnologue).

Dobhane and Khatamma (Khartangma) VDC's, northern Bhojpur District, Kosi Zone; straddling the Irkhuwa River, in Dangmaya, Okharbote, Khartangma, and Dobhane settlements between the Phedi River and Irkhuwa River
Phikkal VDC, Ilam District, Mechi Zone

References

Kiranti languages
Languages of Nepal
Endangered Sino-Tibetan languages
Languages of Koshi Province